Lahore Conspiracy Case may refer to:

 Lahore Conspiracy Case trial (26 April – 13 September, 1915), in the aftermath of the Ghadar conspiracy
 Lahore Conspiracy Case (10 July, 1929 – 7 October, 1930) outlined in